An Offer You Can't Refuse may refer to:

 An Offer You Can't Refuse (album), an album by A Change of Pace
 Offer You Can't Refuse, an EP by Kool G Rap
 An Offer You Can't Refuse (novel), a novel by Jill Mansell